Shaikh Abdullah bin Rashid Al Khalifa is the Bahraini ambassador to the United States.

Career
Abdullah Al Khalifa began his career in the Royal Court of the Kingdom of Bahrain, where he initially oversaw educational affairs. In 2010, he was appointed as the Governor of the Southern Governorate of Bahrain, the largest governorate in the Kingdom.

Awards
 Honorary Distinction Award 2016, for his service and contributions as Governor
 Stevie Award 2019, for his work in the founding and developing of the Drug Abuse Resistance Education D.A.R.E. program, Maan (together) program against violence and addiction

Personal
Al Khalifa resides at the Bahrain Ambassador's Residence in McLean, Virginia, with his wife, Shaikha Aisha bint Jaber Al Khalifa, and their five children.

References

1980 births
Living people
Ambassadors of Bahrain to the United States
Bentley University alumni
House of Khalifa